Mocius (Mucius, died 288–295), also known as "the Holy Hieromartyr", was a priest of Roman ancestry who lived in Amphipolis, Macedonia and became an Orthodox saint.

Life
During a persecution against Christians under the emperor Diocletian (284-305), St Mocius exhorted the pagans who had assembled for the pagan festival of Dionysus (Bacchus), to abandon the customs which accompanied this celebration. He urged them to repent, be converted to Christianity, and be baptized. At the temple of Dionysus, he destroyed a statue of the god.

Mocius was brought to trial before the governor of Laodicea and subjected to torture. After this he was put into a red-hot oven, where he remained unharmed, but the flames coming out of the oven scorched the governor. Then he was given to wild beasts to be eaten, but they did not touch him. The lions lay down at his feet. The people, seeing such miracles, urged that the saint be set free. The governor ordered the saint to be sent to the city of Perinthus, and from there to Byzantium, where St Mocius was beheaded.

His feast day is May 11.

Legacy
The Emperor Anastasius I Dicorus (491-518) built an open air cistern, to supply water to the city of Constantinople (today's Istanbul). It is the third of the Late Roman Period cisterns and the largest in the city, named after the saint who was venerated in a nearby church. In Turkish, it is called "Altı Mermer Çukurbostanı". It has been converted into the Fatih Educational Park, but the ancient walls are still standing.

References

3rd-century Christian martyrs
3rd-century deaths
Saints of Roman Macedonia
Year of birth unknown

Year of death uncertain